Wayne Township is a township in Edwards County, Kansas, USA.  As of the 2000 census, its population was 606.

Geography
According to the USGS, it contains one cemetery, Wayne.

Transportation
Wayne Township contains two airports or landing strips: Cross Landing Strip and Fox Landing Strip.

References
 USGS Geographic Names Information System (GNIS)

External links
 US-Counties.com
 City-Data.com

Townships in Edwards County, Kansas
Townships in Kansas